Hub Vinken (16 April 1926 – 30 March 2010) was a Dutch road cyclist. He won a bronze medal in the road race at the 1949 UCI Road World Championships. Next year he turned professional and won one stage of the Ronde van Nederland in 1951. He retired in 1953.

References

1926 births
2010 deaths
Dutch male cyclists
Sportspeople from Heerlen
UCI Road World Championships cyclists for the Netherlands
Cyclists from Limburg (Netherlands)